Fructan beta-(2,1)-fructosidase (beta-(2-1)-D-fructan fructohydrolase, beta-(2-1)fructan exohydrolase, inulinase, 1-FEH II, 1-fructan exohydrolase, 1-FEH w1, 1-FEH w2, beta-(2-1)-linkage-specific fructan-beta-fructosidase, beta-(2,1)-D-fructan fructohydrolase) is an enzyme with systematic name beta-(2->1)-D-fructan fructohydrolase. This enzyme catalyses the following chemical reaction

 Hydrolysis of terminal, non-reducing (2->1)-linked beta-D-fructofuranose residues in fructans

The best substrates are the inulin-type fructans.

References

External links 
 

EC 3.2.1